Parthenius III (30 November 1919 – 23 July 1996) served as the Greek Orthodox Patriarch of Alexandria between 1986 and 1996.

He was distinguished for his theological knowledge and his manifold activity in the Ecumenical Movement and the Theological Dialogues.

He worked tirelessly for the spread of Orthodox Mission especially in Uganda, where he established the Metropolis of Kampala, and in Kenya.

Patriarch Parthenius III died 23 July 1996 of a heart attack, during his vacations in the Greek islands.

References

1919 births
Egyptian people of Greek descent
1996 deaths
People from Port Said
20th-century Greek Patriarchs of Alexandria
Theological School of Halki alumni